Rezip (formerly Kayatepe) is a village in the Adıyaman District, Adıyaman Province, Turkey. The village is populated by Kurds of the Kawan tribe and had a population of 664 in 2021.

The hamlet of Örenli is attached to the village.

References

Kurdish settlements in Adıyaman Province
Villages in Adıyaman District